Mount Pukaki is a peak between Mount Hawea and Mount Rotoiti in the Frigate Range. Named by the northern party of the New Zealand Geological Survey Antarctic Expedition (NZGSAE) (1961–62) for the New Zealand frigate HMNZS Pukaki.

Mountains of the Ross Dependency
Shackleton Coast